The 1875 East Kent by-election was fought on 27 January 1875.  The byelection was fought due to the succession to a peerage of the incumbent Conservative MP, George Milles.  It was won by the unopposed Conservative candidate Wyndham Knatchbull.

References

1875 in England
1875 elections in the United Kingdom
By-elections to the Parliament of the United Kingdom in Kent constituencies
19th century in Kent
Unopposed by-elections to the Parliament of the United Kingdom in English constituencies
January 1875 events